Konya İdman Yurdu were a Turkish sports club based in Konya, Turkey. The club were founded on 3 July 1923 and dissolved in 1981, when they merged with Konyaspor. The colours of Konya İdman Yurdu were green and white.

History
Konya İdman Yurdu were founded on 3 July 1923. They achieved success in the regional Konya Football League very soon and won the championship title on numerous occasions, participating in the former Turkish Football Championship in several editions as Konya champions. Between 1971 and 1981 the club competed in the Turkish Second League. In 1981 Konya İdman Yurdu merged with rivals Konyaspor and ceased to exist. After both clubs merged the colours of Konyaspor became green and white, replacing their former colours black and white.

League participations
 Turkish Football Championship: 1927, 1932, 1933, 1934, 1935
 TFF First League (second level): 1971–1981
 TFF Second League: 1967–1971

External links
 History of Konyaspor

References

Sport in Konya
Football clubs in Turkey
Association football clubs established in 1923
Association football clubs disestablished in 1981